The 1994 LPGA Championship was the 40th LPGA Championship, played May 12–15 at DuPont Country Club in Wilmington, Delaware.

Laura Davies shot a final round 68 to win the first of her two LPGA Championship titles, three strokes ahead of runner-up  It was the second of her four major titles.

This was the first of eleven consecutive LPGA Championships at DuPont, which had hosted the McDonald's Championship, a regular tour event, the previous seven seasons. McDonald's sponsored the LPGA Championship for sixteen editions, from 1994 through 2009.

Davies had won the regular tour event at DuPont the previous year for consecutive victories at the course.

Past champions in the field

Made the cut

Source:

Missed the cut

Source:
 Lopez played fourteen holes in the first round, then withdrew because of back pain.

Final leaderboard
Sunday, May 15, 1994

Source:

References

External links
Golf Observer leaderboard

Women's PGA Championship
Golf in Delaware
LPGA Championship
LPGA Championship
LPGA Championship
LPGA Championship
Women's sports in Delaware